The 148th Indiana Infantry Regiment was an infantry regiment from Indiana that served in the Union Army between February 25 and September 5, 1865, during the American Civil War.

Service 
Recruited from the 6th district, the regiment was organized at Indianapolis, Indiana, with a strength of 1,027 men and mustered in on February 25, 1865. It left Indiana for Nashville, Tennessee, on February 28. The regiment performed guard and garrison duty in the District of Middle Tennessee, Department of the Cumberland, to early September. The regiment was mustered out on September 5, 1865. During its service the regiment incurred thirty-six fatalities, and another seventy-five deserted.

See also
 List of Indiana Civil War regiments

Notes

References

Bibliography 
 Dyer, Frederick H. (1959). A Compendium of the War of the Rebellion. New York and London. Thomas Yoseloff, Publisher. .
 Holloway, William R. (2004). Civil War Regiments From Indiana. eBookOnDisk.com Pensacola, Florida. .
 Terrell, W.H.H. (1867). The Report of the Adjutant General of the State of Indiana. Containing Rosters for the Years 1861–1865, Volume 7. Indianapolis, Indiana. Samuel M. Douglass, State Printer.

Units and formations of the Union Army from Indiana
1865 establishments in Indiana
Military units and formations established in 1865
Military units and formations disestablished in 1865